Hamid Yusif Hummadi (1935 – 24 May 2022) was an Iraqi politician. He served as Minister of Culture and Information from 1991 to 1996 and Minister of Culture, Tourism, and Antiquities from 1996 to 2003. He died in the United Arab Emirates on 24 May 2022.

References

1935 births
2022 deaths
20th-century Iraqi politicians
21st-century Iraqi politicians
Government ministers of Iraq
University of Baghdad alumni
People from Tikrit